Yuni Shara is an Indonesian singer, she is the elder sister of singer Krisdayanti. She was born as Wahyu Setyaning Budi in Batu, East Java on 3 June 1972. Her debut was in a music festival called Festival Bintang Radio & Televisi in 1987 when she was 15 years old, she won 2nd place. In 1989, she participated in the same festival and she won first place. This is where she was offered a record deal by Billboard. She released her first record in 1990 titled Jatuh Cinta Lagi. In 1991 she released another record titled Hilang Permataku, in 1992 she released Salah Tingkah. Her career peaked with the release of the record Mengapa Tiada Maaf in 1995. The record sold 1.5 million copies and BASF awarded her with 4 Platinum Records. She also received 3 more Platinum Record for the Indonesian version of the soundtrack to the martial arts TV series Return of the Condor Heroes.

Her choice of songs are mainly popular old melancholic songs, an example is the Keroncong style. However, her career stopped to a halt due to a surge in new pop groups that appealed more to young audience.

Her ex partner is the actor, Raffi Ahmad, with whom she released a duet Cinta Ini in 2011.

References

1972 births
Living people
Indonesian people of Dutch descent
21st-century Indonesian women singers
Indonesian pop singers
Anugerah Musik Indonesia winners
Javanese people
People from Batu, East Java
20th-century Indonesian women singers
Indonesian film actresses
Indonesian television actresses
Warner Music Group artists